Martha A. S. Qorro (pronunciation: /KORroʊ/, KORro) is a linguist and an Associate Professor at the Centre for Communication Studies of the University of Dar es Salaam, known for her research into the use of the Kiswahili language as preferable language of instruction in Tanzania, and the Iraqw language. 

She obtained her doctoral degree in 1999 at the University of Dar es Salaam with the thesis A qualitative study of the teaching and learning of writing of English in Tanzania secondary school in relation to the writing requirements of tertiary education. Before working at the University of Dar es Salaam since 1983, Qorro was a teacher of English and Kiswahili in Tanzanian secondary education. She lectures and performs research on language education and policy, while playing a role in the societal debate on language teaching and the choice of language of instruction in education.

Publications
Qorro published many scholary articles and books, including:
 with Zaline M. Roy-Campbell: Language crisis in Tanzania : the myth of English versus education. Mkuki Na Nyota Publishers, Dar es Salaam, Tanzania, 1997.
 with Maarten Mous and Roland Kiessling: Iraqw-English dictionary : with an English and a thesaurus index. Rüdiger Köppe, Köln, 2002.
 with Birgit Brock-Utne and Zubeida Desai: Language of instruction in Tanzania and South Africa (LOITASA). E & D Ltd., Dar-es-Salaam, 2003.
 with Zubeida Desai and Birgit Brock-Utne (Eds): Educational challenges in multilingual societies : LOITASA phase two research. African Minds, [South Africa], 2010.
 Language of instruction in Tanzania: 'Why are research findings not heeded?' International Review of Education / Internationale Zeitschrift für Erziehungswissenschaft / Revue Internationale de l'Education, 59:1 (June 2013), pp 29–45.
 with Shemilis Mazengia, Esayas Desta, Wondimu Gaga Gashe, Josephat Maghway, and Fugich Wako: A unified standard orthography for Cushitic languages : (Ethiopia, Somalia, Djibouti, Eritrea, Kenya, & Tanzania) : Afar, Borana, Burji, Gede'o, Hadiyya, Iraqw, Kambata, Konso, Oromo, Saaho, Sidaama, Somali. Monograph Series No. 258 Year 2014. Centre for Advanced Studies of African Society (CASAS), Cape Town, South Africa, 2014.
 Language of instruction for public schools in Tanzania : the missing link between research and policy, HakiElimu, Dar es Salaam, 2017.

External links
 . Video by African Intellectuals, 20 November 2018. Kiswahili explanation: Hali ya Uchumi na Siasa Nchini Tanzania Miaka mitatu ya Serikali ya Awamu ya Tano: "Tunatoka wapi, Tuko wapi na Tunakwenda wapi" (translation: Economic and political situation in Tanzania. Three years of the Fifth Phase Government: "Where we come from, where we are and where we are going"). Speech by Qorro on Kiswahili in Kiswahili at the University of Dar es Salaam. Duration 21m 44s.
 . Video by Jenerali Online, 6 July 2020. In Kiswahili. Duration 43m 00s.

References

Linguists
Linguists from Tanzania
Living people
Swahili-language writers
Tanzanian schoolteachers
University of Dar es Salaam alumni
Academic staff of the University of Dar es Salaam
Year of birth missing (living people)